Jefferson Township is a township in Dickinson County, Kansas, USA.  As of the 2000 census, its population was 166.

Jefferson Township was organized in 1873.

Geography

Further reading

References

 USGS Geographic Names Information System (GNIS)

External links
 City-Data.com

Townships in Dickinson County, Kansas
Townships in Kansas